In mathematics, Peetre's inequality, named after Jaak Peetre, says that for any real number  and any vectors  and  in  the following inequality holds:

The inequality was proved by J. Peetre in 1959 and has founds applications in functional analysis and Sobolev spaces.

See also

References

 .
 .
 .

External links

 Planetmath.org: Peetre's inequality

Functional analysis
Inequalities
Linear algebra